Marija Mačiulienė  (born 1929 in Kaunas) is a Lithuanian painter.

His 1962 mosaic is featured at the entrance to Druskininkai's Sveikatingumo Park.

See also
List of Lithuanian painters

References
 Sveikatingumo Parkas. In Your Pocket City Guides. Accessed 2010-11-19.
 Dailėraštis. Lithuanian Artists' Association. Accessed 2010-11-19.
 Universal Lithuanian Encyclopedia

Lithuanian painters
1929 births
Living people
20th-century Lithuanian women artists
21st-century Lithuanian women artists